The Centro de Fotografía Isla de Tenerife (Photo Center Tenerife Island) is located in the city of Santa Cruz de Tenerife (Spain) and was created in 1989.

Owns a studio and photo lab, conference room, a specialized library with more than 3,500 volumes, files, and store collections. Its headquarters is located in the TEA (Tenerife Espacio de las Artes).

External links 
Organismo Autónomo de Museos y Centros de Tenerife

Museums in Tenerife
Buildings and structures in Santa Cruz de Tenerife
Photography museums and galleries in Spain
Art museums established in 1989
1989 establishments in Spain
Art museums and galleries in Spain